This was the first edition of the event.

Johan Kriek won the title, defeating Michael Westphal 6–2, 6–4 in the final.

Seeds

  Johan Kriek (champion)
  Gene Mayer (second round)
  Scott Davis (second round)
  Peter Fleming (first round)
  Leif Shiras (quarterfinals)
  Brad Gilbert (first round)
  Tim Gullikson (first round)
  Ben Testerman (first round)

Draw

Finals

Top half

Bottom half

External links
 Main draw

1984 Livingston Open
1984 Grand Prix (tennis)